Plectritis macrocera is a species of flowering plant in the honeysuckle family known by the common names longhorn seablush and white plectritis. It is native to western North America from British Columbia to Montana  to California, where it is a common plant in mountains, valleys, open steppe, and coastal habitat types. It is an annual herb growing erect to a maximum height between 60 and 80 centimeters. The widely spaced, paired and oppositely arranged leaves are oval or somewhat oblong, smooth-edged, and up to 4.5 centimeters long by 2 wide. The upper ones lack petioles. The inflorescence is a dense, cylindrical, headlike cluster of flowers in shades of pale pink to white. The corolla is under a centimeter long and is divided into five lobes and a short, blunt spur.

References

External links 
 
 Jepson Manual Treatment
 Washington Burke Museum
 Photo gallery

Valerianoideae
Flora of California
Flora without expected TNC conservation status